Carina Witthöft was the defending champion, but lost in the final to Magda Linette, 3–6, 5–7.

Seeds

Main draw

Finals

Top half

Bottom half

References 
 Main draw

Engie Open de Cagnes-sur-Mer Alpes-Maritimes - Singles